Cedar Point State Park is a  state park located on Cedar Point in the Town of Cape Vincent in Jefferson County, New York. The park is located on Route 12E on the St. Lawrence River.

The park was established in 1898 as part of the St. Lawrence Reservation.

Facilities
Cedar Point State Park offers a beach, picnic tables and pavilions, a playground, a marina, fishing pier, hunting (seasonal waterfowl), recreation programs, a boat launch and docks, a campground with tent and trailer sites.

See also
 List of New York state parks

References

External links
 New York State Parks: Cedar Point State Park

State parks of New York (state)
Parks in Jefferson County, New York